A penumbral lunar eclipse will take place on Thursday, October 30, 2031.

Visibility

Related lunar eclipses

Lunar year series

See also 
List of lunar eclipses and List of 21st-century lunar eclipses

Notes

External links 
 

2031-10
2031-10
2031 in science